|}

The Grande Course de Haies d'Auteuil, sometimes referred to as the French Champion Hurdle, is a Group 1 hurdle race in France which is open to horses aged five years or older. It is run at Auteuil over a distance of 5,100 metres (about 3 miles and 1½ furlongs), and it is scheduled to take place each year in June.

History
The race was first run on May 25, 1874, the same day as the inaugural running of the Grand National de France (now the Grand Steeple-Chase de Paris). It was originally open to horses aged four or older, and it was initially contested over 4,000 metres. This was increased to 4,800 metres in its second year, and to 5,000 metres in 1880. The race was given a new date in 1882 – it was moved to the Wednesday after the Grand Steeple-Chase de Paris, which continued to be run on the last Sunday in May. The following year saw the launch of a new steeplechase at Auteuil, the Prix des Drags, and this was scheduled for the Friday of the same week. This week of top class jump races became known as the Grande Semaine d'Auteuil. The Grande Course de Haies was run as a handicap until 1889, but since then it has held weight for age conditions.

The race was abandoned throughout World War I, with no running from 1915 to 1918. During World War II it was cancelled only once, in 1940. The minimum age was raised to five in 1961, when a new hurdle race, the Grande Course de Haies des 4 Ans (later titled the Prix Alain du Breil), was introduced specifically for four-year-olds. The distance of the Grande Course de Haies was extended to 5,100 metres in 1969. This was cut to 4,100 metres in 1975, and then restored to 5,100 metres in 1979.

Four horses have won both this event and the Grand Steeple-Chase de Paris. These are Blagueur II, Loreto, Ubu III and Mid Dancer. The 1947 winner of the Grande Course de Haies, Le Paillon, later won the most prestigious flat race in France, the Prix de l'Arc de Triomphe. The 1984 winner, Dawn Run (a mare trained in Ireland), also won both the Champion Hurdle and the Cheltenham Gold Cup in England. She returned to Auteuil to attempt a repeat victory in 1986, but during the race she misjudged a hurdle, fell, and died almost instantly.

In 2010, the race was won by flat jockey Christophe Soumillon.

Records
Leading jockey (4 wins):
 John Boon – Vertige (1894), Charlatan (1895), Grandlieu (1898), Kerym (1899)

Leading trainer (8 wins):
 William Head – Evohe II (1937, 1938), Royal Kidney (1939), Ludovic le More (1943), Vatelys (1946), Le Paillon (1947), Septieme Ciel (1948), Friendship (1959)

Leading owner (6 wins):
 Daniel Wildenstein – Gopal (1969), Top Gear (1977), Paiute (1979, 1980), World Citizen (1982), Vaporetto (1999)

Winners since 1970

Earlier winners

 1874 - Jackal
 1875 - Borely
 1876 - Vichnou
 1877 - Miss Lizzie
 1878 - Patriarche
 1879 - Paul's Cray
 1880 - Doublon
 1881 - Seaman
 1882 - Marc Antony
 1883 - Beatus
 1884 - Baudres
 1885 - Newmarket
 1886 - Jannock
 1887 - Kersage
 1888 - Aladdin
 1889 - Vanille
 1890 - Saint Claude
 1891 - Augure
 1892 - Le Gourzy
 1893 - Ranville
 1894 - Vertige
 1895 - Charlatan
 1896 - Count Schomberg
 1897 - Soliman
 1898 - Grandlieu
 1899 - Kerym
 1900 - General Peace
 1901 - Monsieur Piperlin
 1902 - Bebe *
 1903 - Nivolet
 1904 - Hipparque
 1905 - Karakoul
 1906 - Fragilite
 1907 - Chi Lo Sa
 1908 - Ingenu
 1909 - Herisson II
 1910 - Blagueur II
 1911 - Carpe Diem
 1912 - Balscadden
 1913 - Galafron
 1914 - Lilium
 1915–18 - no race
 1919 - Saint Tudwal
 1920 - Chaud
 1921 - Forearm
 1922 - Fauche le Pre
 1923 - Onyx II
 1924 - Arrowhead
 1925 - Rocking Chair
 1926 - Histoire de Rire
 1927 - Lannilis
 1928 - Don Zuniga
 1929 - Largo
 1930 - Le Bouif
 1931 - Baoule
 1932 - Pour le Roi
 1933 - Lands End
 1934 - Lord Byron
 1935 - Robin des Bois
 1936 - Cerealiste
 1937 - Evohe II
 1938 - Evohe II *
 1939 - Royal Kidney
 1940 - no race
 1941 - Short
 1942 - Lycoming
 1943 - Ludovic le More
 1944 - Wild Risk
 1945 - Wild Risk
 1946 - Vatelys
 1947 - Le Paillon
 1948 - Septieme Ciel
 1949 - Nigra
 1950 - Amati
 1951 - Verdi
 1952 - Prince Hindou
 1953 - Frascati
 1954 - Sicie
 1955 - Elegant
 1956 - Mehariste
 1957 - Romantisme
 1958 - Loreto
 1959 - Friendship
 1960 - Poutje Elday
 1961 - Choute
 1962 - Miror
 1963 - Ouf
 1964 - Santo Pietro
 1965 - Ketch
 1966 - Pansa
 1967 - Rivoli
 1968 - Orvilliers
 1969 - Gopal

* Mr Quilp finished first in 1902 but was disqualified.* Porthos finished first in 1938 but was relegated to third place following a Stewards' Inquiry.

See also
 List of French jump horse races

References

 France-Galop / Racing Post:

 galop.courses-france.com:
 1874–1889, 1890–1919, 1920–1949, 1950–1979, 1980–present

 france-galop.com – A Brief History: Grande Course de Haies d'Auteuil.
 pedigreequery.com – Grande Course de Haies d'Auteuil – Auteuil.
 galopp-sieger.de - Grand Course de Haies d'Auteuil

Horse races in France
Recurring events established in 1874
National Hunt hurdle races